The bar-crested antshrike (Thamnophilus multistriatus) is a species of bird in the family Thamnophilidae.

It is found in Colombia and Venezuela. Its natural habitats are subtropical or tropical dry forests, subtropical or tropical moist montane forests, and heavily degraded former forest.

References

bar-crested antshrike
Birds of the Colombian Andes
Birds of Venezuela
bar-crested antshrike
Taxonomy articles created by Polbot